This is a list of the Canada men's national soccer team results from 1980 to 1999.

Results

1980

1981

1983

1984

1985

1986

1987

1988

1989

1990–1999

References

Soccer in Canada
1980s in Canadian sports
1990s in Canadian sports
Canada men's national soccer team results